Rebecca Foon (born 13 December 1978) is a Canadian cellist, vocalist, and composer from Montreal, Quebec. Foon currently records under her own name, as well as the alias Saltland, and is a member and co-founder of the Juno Award-winning modern chamber ensemble Esmerine. She has also been a member of several groups associated with the post rock, experimental, and chamber music scenes of Montreal and New York City, including Set Fire to Flames, A Silver Mt. Zion, and Colin Stetson’s Gorecki Symphony of Sorrow ensemble. Esmerine's Turkish folk influenced album Dalmak, released in 2013, was awarded the Juno Award for Instrumental Album of the Year in 2014. In 2013, she released her first Saltland album, which Exclaim.ca called "a captivating combination of genres from dream pop to chamber music to ambient and shoegaze." In 2020, Foon released Waxing Moon, her first album under her own name, which received international acclaim. Foon has also composed many soundtracks for film and museums. Foon is an environmental activist and co-founder, with Jesse Paris Smith, of Pathway to Paris and the 1000 Cities Initiative for Carbon Freedom, dedicated to turning the Paris Agreement into reality.

Early life
Rebecca Foon was born in 1978 in Canada, and raised in Vancouver. She is the daughter of art educator and producer Jane Howard Baker, and playwright, producer, screenwriter, and novelist Dennis Foon.

Music career

Early years

In 1996, when she was 17, Foon moved to Montreal from Vancouver, and soon became involved in the city's DIY music scene. She has been a member of several groups associated with the post rock, experimental and chamber music scene of Montreal, including ongoing collaborations with a number of musicians who are members of post-rock band Godspeed You! Black Emperor as well as indie rock band Arcade Fire. Among her earliest projects, in 1995, Foon teamed up with Spencer Krug (Wolf Parade, Sunset Rubdown, and Moonface) and Rachel Levine (Cakelk), forming the instrumental string/piano/accordion-based trio Fifths of Seven. Foon collaborated with choreographer Alyson Vishnovska to perform in the 1999 edition of the Edgy Women Festival.

A Silver Mt. Zion

Soon after moving to Montreal, Foon began playing cello and composing with Thee Silver Mt. Zion Memorial Orchestra, a band that formed in Montreal in 1999. Foon joined in 2000, when the band expanded from a trio into a sextet. Foon plays on the band's second album, Born into Trouble as the Sparks Fly Upward, released in 2001 on Constellation Records. The minimalist album was well received by music critics, with Allmusic giving it 4.5/5 stars, and Pitchfork Media giving it 7.7/10. The band took its first extensive tour in early 2001, traveling throughout Europe. That year Foon began playing in the associated band Set Fire to Flames as well.

The next Silver Mt. Zion album, "This Is Our Punk-Rock," Thee Rusted Satellites Gather + Sing, released in 2003, saw no change in the core line-up, excluding the inclusion of a makeshift choir. The album was essentially created as a requiem for open and abandoned spaces in Montreal, as well as for similar loss and decay around the world, due to either urban development or military action. Foon continued to perform live and recorded two more records with the band while she began working on other projects. Horses in the Sky was the band's first to include lyrics on every track, with Foon contributing to the vocals and also helping mix the recording. In 2008, Silver Mt. Zion toured Europe and North America. That summer, Foon and several other members resigned from the band.

Set Fire to Flames

In 2001, she became a member of the Montreal post-rock band Set Fire to Flames. The band released two albums before it split in 2003, and many of their tracks are very minimalist in nature, filled with ambient noise and various other non-musical sound effects, juxtaposed or combined with instrumental music. 2001 saw her contribute to the band's debut Sings Reign Rebuilder. The album was recorded in a century old house apparently bound for destruction. As such, several sounds usually edited out of the recording process, including creaking floors, paper shuffling and outside noises such as police sirens were left intact on the final album. The album met with a glowing reception in the press; receiving 9/10 stars from Pitchfork Media, 4/5 from Allmusic, and 4.5/5 from Sputnikmusic.

Two years later, in 2003, she again contributed to Telegraphs in Negative/Mouths Trapped in Static  by Set Fire to Flames. Recorded in a barn in Ontario, the release utilizes many different instruments, including guitars, basses, strings, horns, glockenspiel, marimba, bass clarinet, saw, cymbalon, hurdy-gurdy, music boxes, modified electronics, and contact microphones. The album was even more experimental than the previous, and met with mixed reviews from magazines such as Sputnik.

Esmerine

In 2001, Foon co-founded the chamber rock group Esmerine with percussionist Bruce Cawdron. The two had met while recording Set Fire to Flames' debut album. However, instead of using the guitar-focused sound of their other projects, the duo initially focused on marimba and cello, drawing on minimalist classical music and chamber music. The band initially performed their original music in gigs around Montreal.

Esmerine released their debut album, If Only a Sweet Surrender to the Nights to Come Be True, in 2003. Allmusic gave it 4/5 stars and called it "a sublime chamber rock album," stating "A French female name meaning quiet and sensitive, Esmerine is a fitting moniker for the overall sound." They released their second album Aurora in 2005. Afterwards, Foon dedicated more time to Thee Silver Mt. Zion, though she continued to periodically perform with Esmerine in Montreal, often bringing in guest artists or collaborating with other groups.

La Lechuza and Dalmak
As Esmerine, Foon and Bruce Cawdron began writing new music together in earnest in 2009, when their friend Lhasa de Sela invited them to open up for her as well as collaborate together. For their third album, La Lechuza, two new members joined the group: Sarah Pagé, a harp player, and multi-instrumentalist Andrew Barr. Released in 2011, La Lechuza was listed as one of the top ten underground records of the year in Mojo.

La Lechuza is thus dedicated to Lhasa de Sela, a dear friend of the band's, who died of breast cancer in Montreal on 1 January 2010. The band collaborated with Patrick Watson on the album and released a song entitled "Snow Day for Lhasa", as well as created a site –  – dedicated in loving memory to Lhasa. Patrick Watson also contributed vocals on two songs and produced the album, with other guests contributing, including violinist Sarah Neufeld (Arcade Fire) and saxophonist Colin Stetson.

After Barr and Page became occupied with their other projects, Esmerine added two new members to their touring lineup: percussionist Jamie Thomson and multi-instrumentalist Brian Sanderson. After a number of live performances, the quartet began writing new material in early 2012. After performing in Istanbul, the band was invited to return for an artist residency later that year. They decided to turn a rented loft into a makeshift recording studio, and recorded an album in the loft, collaborating with Turkish musicians they had met there; they later toured together. Among the guest musicians were Hakan Vreskala, Baran Aşık, Ali Kazim Akdağ, and James Hakan Dedeoğlu, who contributed instruments such as the bendir, darbuka, erbane, meh, barama, saz, and electric guitar. The album, Dalmak, was completed in the winter of 2012 and 2013 at Breakglass Studios in Montreal, with engineer Jace Lasek. The word "dalmak" means "immerse" in Turkish. It can also be interpreted as "to dive into," "to contemplate," and "to be absorbed in." The album, Dalmak, was released in 2013 and awarded Instrumental Album of the Year at the Juno Awards of 2014. The Line of Best Fit gave it 7.5/10 stars, saying "they ultimately craft gorgeous, sparkling experimental noises that blur the line between post-rock, minimalist electronica and Turkish folk."

Other albums
In 2004, Foon teamed up with Spencer Krug (Wolf Parade, Sunset Rubdown, and Moonface) and Rachel Levine (Cakelk) to form the string/piano/accordion-based trio Fifths of Seven, releasing its first album, Spry from Bitter Anise Folds, in 2005, which met with a positive reception. 2005 saw Foon contribute cello to a number of other albums as well. Among these were From Cells of Roughest Air by The Mile End Ladies String Auxiliary, with Sophie Trudeau (Godspeed You! Black Emperor, A Silver Mt. Zion) and Genevieve Heistek (HangedUp). Foon also recorded Lost Voices in 2015 and Mechanics of Dominion in 2017 with Esmerine.

Collaborations, guest appearances, and soundtracks
She has had guest appearances on albums such as Just Another Ordinary Day  by Patrick Watson in 2003; Do You Like Rock Music? by British Sea Power in 2011; North Star Deserter by Vic Chesnutt and Return to the Sea by Islands in 2007; and Hot Wax by Grant Hart in 2009. In 2011, she was involved with the film and music project National Parks Project by Last Gang Records. Foon has performed with a range of musicians, including Inuit throat singer Tanya Tagaq, Patti Smith, Jesse Paris Smith, Tenzin Choegyal, Colin Stetson, Laurie Anderson, Lhasa De Sela, and Nick Cave and the Bad Seeds, and has composed for various film soundtracks, including Shannon Walsh's feature-length documentary H2Oil, with Ian Ilavsky, co-founder of Constellation Records. The film is a documentary on the extraction of oil from tar sands in Alberta. Foon has also composed several soundtracks for the National Film Board of Canada and many museums and has been a touring member of Sam Green and Brent Green's Live Cinema, along with Brendan Canty, James Canty, and Kate Ryan.

Saltland
I Thought It Was Us But It Was All of Us (2013)
In 2010, she began working on solo material, enlisting the help of Jamie Thompson (The Unicorns) on percussion and programming. Handling vocals and cello, among the sounds on which Foon focused were drone, no wave, improv, dream pop, and minimalism; eventually, the project Saltland was formed. After several years, this work culminated in the release of I Thought It Was Us But It Was All of Us on Constellation Records in 2013. Among the guest musicians on the album were Sarah Neufeld, Colin Stetson, Laurel Sprengelmeyer of Little Scream, and Richard Reed Parry of Arcade Fire.

All of the songs were constructed from cello loops. About the themes, Foon stated she was trying to create a "sonic landscape" that would allow her to explore themes such as urban landscapes, urban poverty and youth homelessness, environmental issues, and "the control/criminalisation of protest and political action, which is a huge issue in general and particularly in Montreal these days." About the mood of the compositions, "I don't consider the music to be reductively dark and cold, I was really seeking to hold a lot of different tones and feelings in tension: clear-eyed observation, reverie, meditation, activism/agency – and hope and warmth too. It's not a pretty world these days, but I wanted to also leave the listener with a sense of hope."

Reception
Exclaim.ca called it "a captivating combination of genres from dream pop to chamber music to ambient and shoegaze." The Skinny gave it 4/5 stars and a positive review, calling her vocals "hypnotic" and stating the project "eschews the overwrought melodrama of [Thee Silver Mt. Zion and Set Fire to Flames] for an intricate and understated approach, blending soft, tender vocals with strings, drones and electronica." According to Beats Per Minutes, "The songs on this record seem to revel in the evocation of tangible places. Each song seems to unfold into a vast landscape of dust-covered hills and barren horizons-all encased in a gauzy analog haze."

In 2013 and 2014, Saltland toured throughout Canada and the United States with Spencer Krug's Moonface. In 2017, she released her second album, partly co-written with Warren Ellis, A Common Truth, which met with critical acclaim.

Waxing Moon
In 2020, Foon released Waxing Moon, her first album under her own name. The climate crisis has profoundly framed Foon's political and artistic life and Waxing Moon finds her writing and singing her most arrestingly direct yet poetic words. While piano figures most prominently on the record, Foon plays cello on several tracks and is complemented by musical guests, including Richard Reed Parry (Arcade Fire) and Mishka Stein (Patrick Watson) on acoustic and electric basses, Sophie Trudeau (Godspeed You Black Emperor) on violin, Jace Lasek (The Besnard Lakes) on electric guitar, and Patrick Watson as co-vocalist on the dreamlike "Vessels". Foon co-produced the album with Lasek at Montréal's Breakglass studio. The album had a glowing response, including from Electronic Sound: "this hugely gifted cellist has gone neoclassically solo. Whilst Foon's beautifully assured cello and elegantly minimalist piano features throughout, it's that extraordinarily expressive voice of hers that really headlines. Exquisitely tender on 'Ocean Song' and rousingly impassioned on the Arcade-Fire-nodding 'Wide Open Eyes', Foon's talent feels more boundless now than ever." Mojo stated, "the ambience is heavy and sometimes ominous, with Foon's deep-trawling voice at the core, but appropriately, Waxing Moon – named for when the moon's brightness increases – is bathed in hope and spiritual substance."

Pathway to Paris
Founded by Jesse Paris Smith and Rebecca Foon (Foon and Smith met playing with Patti Smith at Ornette Coleman's Meltdown Festival in London in 2009), Pathway to Paris was born shortly after the 2014 People's Climate March, where 400,000 citizens took to the streets of New York City. Smith and Foon organized a concert event at Le Poisson Rouge, a small venue in New York City, where iconic figures took the stage, including Michael Stipe, Thurston Moore, Patti Smith, and prolific climate-thinker and writer, Bill McKibben. Since then, Smith and Foon have organized world class events around the globe tied to major climate events, such as Climate Week NYC and the Global Climate Action Summit, and most notably, the UN Climate Change meetings. In December 2015, during UN COP21, the duo organized high profile events at Le Trianon theatre in Paris to help raise awareness and highlight the importance of ensuring the establishment of the Paris Agreement. Thom Yorke, Flea, Patti Smith, Warren Ellis, Tenzin Choegyal, Dr. Vandana Shiva, Bill McKibben, Naomi Klein, Gregor Robertson (Mayor of Vancouver at the time), as well as Smith and Foon, took the stage for two nights, despite the attacks that occurred at the Bataclan just weeks before, and most cultural events and Cop21 gatherings being canceled by a major city shutdown. When the Paris Agreement was established shortly after these awe-inspiring concerts, Foon and Smith, thinking their work was done, quickly realized it was urgently time to put their efforts in supporting the world in turning the Paris Agreement into reality, and officially started a 501(c)3 non-profit organization, aptly named Pathway to Paris.

Smith and Foon, throughout their climate journey together, have recognized the importance of offering solutions to limiting global temperature rise to 1.5 degrees Celsius. In 2017, they announced their 1000 Cities Initiative for Carbon Freedom at the UN Secretariat. The idea behind the 1000 Cities Initiative for Carbon Freedom is that if 1000 cities design and implement ambitious climate action plans targeting 100% renewable energy and zero emissions as soon as possible, then the targets of the Paris Agreement can actually be met. 

Shortly after announcing the 1000 Cities Initiative at the UN, Foon and Smith organized a concert event at Carnegie Hall, in collaboration with the United Nations Development Program, with an outstanding cast of musicians and leading thinkers, including Joan Baez, Talib Kweli, Patti Smith, Michael Stipe, Cat Power, Bill McKibben, Olafur Eliasson, Tenzin Choegyal, Vandana Shiva, plus Smith and Foon.

During Bill McKibben’s time onstage at Carnegie Hall, he asked the audience to remove the DivestNY insert from their playbills, and use it to write a letter to NY Comptroller Scott Stringer, urging him to divest New York's pension fund from fossil fuels. Together, New York's pension funds are among the largest in the world, representing a combined $390 billion.

After the event, the audience was asked to drop the letters off in the lobby at the 350NYC table, or mail them directly. A few days later, 350 and Pathway to Paris mailed the collected 3000 letters to Scott Stringer's office, while also sending out calls to action for anyone else in the city to send their own letters or visit DivestNY to send an email. A climate hearing with Public Advocate Tisch James was scheduled, and it was urgent that anyone available attend the hearing and make a testimony. 

On January 10, after over five years of community campaigning for New York to divest from fossil fuels, Mayor de Blasio and City Comptroller Scott Stringer confirmed the proposal to freeze all current fossil fuel investments, divest New York's public pension funds fossil fuel companies, and reinvest in renewable energy. Mayor De Blasio also announced that New York City would be suing five major oil companies, seeking damages for the costs of infrastructure improvements to contend with the effects of climate change. London has followed New York City's lead and is carving out its own leading divestment strategy. New York State also announced plans to eject oil and gas stocks from its $226 billion financial portfolio, becoming the first U.S. state and the biggest pension fund anywhere to divest from fossil fuels.

At Pathway to Paris events, audience members are asked to write letters, sign petitions (such as the Pathway to Paris 1000 Cities petition, take pledges, and participate in a ‘Little Sun Sunrise,’ a collective community artwork, led by artist Olafur Eliasson. These solar lamps, donated by The Little Sun Foundation, are then sent following the event to a location in the world which is off the grid, disconnected from city resources, or hit by a climate disaster. 

At every Pathway to Paris concert, the concert ends with Patti Smith bringing everyone on stage to unite with the audience to sing her anthem for action, "People Have the Power". In honor of their six-year anniversary, and during Climate Week in September 2020, Pathway to Paris made a video bringing together voices from around the world to sing "People Have the Power".

Personal life
As of 2021, Foon is based in Montreal. She is an environmental and social activist and a member of Sustainability Solutions Group, a "sustainability and climate change consulting cooperative." She is also a co-founder of the Peruvian Amazon-based nonprofit, Junglekeepers, working to protect the Madre de Dios region of Peru. With Jesse Paris Smith, Foon co-founded Pathway to Paris, a nonprofit bringing together musicians, writers, leading thinkers and environmental activists to foster climate action and help turn the Paris Agreement into action. Pathway to Paris' acclaimed concert events have taken place internationally, including in 2017 at Carnegie Hall, and have included activists and performers such as Patti Smith, Michael Stipe, Flea, Thom Yorke, Johnny Depp, Joan Baez, Cat Power, Bob Weir, Talib Kweli, Tony Hawk, Olafur Eliasson, Bill McKibben, Vandana Shiva, Naomi Klein, Angelique Kidjo, Dhani Harrison, along with Smith and Foon. In 2017, Jesse Paris Smith and Foon announced their 1000 Cities Initiative for Carbon Freedom at a press conference at the United Nations Secretariat.

Awards and nominations

Discography

Solo material

With groups
A Silver Mt. Zion

2001: Born into Trouble as the Sparks Fly Upward 
2003: "This Is Our Punk-Rock," Thee Rusted Satellites Gather + Sing 
2005: Horses in the Sky 
2008: 13 Blues for Thirteen Moons

Set Fire to Flames
2001: Sings Reign Rebuilder 
2003: Telegraphs in Negative/Mouths Trapped in Static

Esmerine
2003: If Only a Sweet Surrender to the Nights to Come Be True
2005: Aurora
2011: La Lechuza 
2013: Dalmak
2015: Lost Voices
2017: Mechanics of Dominion
2022: Everything Was Forever Until It Was No More

The Mile End Ladies String Auxiliary
2005: From Cells of Roughest Air

Fifths of Seven
2005: Spry from Bitter Anise Folds

Guest appearances

Soundtracks
2020: Thanadoula (short animation by Robin McKenna)
2017: The Departure (by Lana Wilson)
2017: Freelancer on the Front Lines with Esmerine (by Santiago Bertolino)
2016: Live Cinema with Brendan Canty, Kate Ryan and James Canty (by Sam Green and Brent Green)
2013: My Little Underground (short animation by Elise Simard)
2012: National Parks Project
2012: The Kiss (short animation by Eva Cvijanovic)
2008: H2Oil (by Shannon Walsh)

Featured on 
2014: Evolution of a Criminal (by Darius Clark Monroe)
2011: A Walk into the Sea (by Esther Robinson)
2010: Higglety Pigglety Pop! or There Must Be More to Life (short animation by Chris Lavis & Maciek Szczerbowski)
2007: Madame Tutli-Putli (stop motion-animated short film by Chris Lavis & Maciek Szczerbowski)

Further reading
Interviews

See also
Juno Awards of 2014

References

External links

Rebecca Foon at Sustainability Solutions Groups

1978 births
Living people
Canadian rock cellists
Musicians from Vancouver